The Ritter-Morton House is a historic two-story house in Spring Hill, Tennessee, U.S..

History
The house was built in 1878 for Peter Ritter and his wife, Elizabeth. It was designed in the Carpenter Gothic architectural style. It was acquired by John C. Witt on March 1, 1886. By January 1899, it was purchased by A. P. Odil.

The house has been listed on the National Register of Historic Places since December 12, 1976.

References

Houses on the National Register of Historic Places in Tennessee
Gothic Revival architecture in Tennessee
Houses completed in 1878
Houses in Maury County, Tennessee